Phyllodytes maculosus is a species of frogs in the family Hylidae endemic to Brazil.

References

Phyllodytes
Endemic fauna of Brazil
Amphibians described in 2007